Kostyantyn Oleksiyovych Balabanov (born 13 August 1982) is a Ukrainian former football player and manager.

Career
Balabanov was born in Kiliya, at the time in the Ukrainian SSR of the Soviet Union (today in the Odesa Oblast of southern Ukraine). He is a graduate of Chornomorets academy. In 2005, he was transferred to FC Dnipro Dnipropetrovsk. Having been featured in a few matches over the next 2 seasons, he was loaned out to FC Naftovyk-Ukrnafta Okhtyrka in 2008, and then to FC Kryvbas Kryvyi Rih. After his contract with Dnipro expired in 2009, he spent the next season without any professional football. In July 2010, he signed a new contract with Chornomorets.

External links 

 
 
 

1982 births
Living people
People from Kiliya
Ukrainian footballers
Ukraine international footballers
FC Chornomorets Odesa players
FC Chornomorets-2 Odesa players
FC Dnipro players
FC Naftovyk-Ukrnafta Okhtyrka players
FC Kryvbas Kryvyi Rih players
FC Oleksandriya players
FC Dnister Ovidiopol players
Ukrainian Premier League players
Ukrainian First League players
Ukrainian Second League players
Association football forwards
Sportspeople from Odesa Oblast